VDZ may refer to:

 IATA code for Valdez Airport
 Verband Deutscher Zoodirektoren (German Federation of Zoo Directors)
 Verband Deutscher Zeitschriftenverleger (Association of German Magazine Publishers) in Deutscher Pressevertrieb
 Verein Deutscher Zementwerke (German Cement Works Association) in Refuse-derived fuel